The Revolution Continues Alliance (Taḥaluf al-ṯẖawra mustamirra, sometimes referred to as Istikmāl al-ṯẖawra or  Completing the Revolution), abbreviated to RCA, was a left-leaning, mostly secular electoral alliance in Egypt.  It was formed by two socialist, two liberal, and an Islamic party. The alliance had announced its electoral platform on 23 October 2011, one day before the deadline for the parliamentary election starting on 24 November.

The formation followed a conflict inside the broad left-leaning secular and liberal Egyptian Bloc over the participation of exponents of the old regime and the dominance of a few parties within the bloc. When they could not enforce their demands, the Socialist Popular Alliance Party and the Egyptian Socialist Party left the Bloc. The alliance's electoral campaign was launched on 2 November.

The aim of this alliance was to keep the revolutionary spirit in the parliament and to achieve all the demands of the 2011 Egyptian revolution.

The alliance is effectively defunct since almost all of the parties in the coalition have left it. The Egyptian Current Party and Egypt Freedom Party have gone on to join other coalitions. The Coalition of Revolutionary Youth disbanded in July 2012. The Socialist Popular Alliance Party and the Egyptian Socialist Party decided to merge into one socialist party. The Socialist Popular Alliance Party joined the Revolutionary Democratic Coalition.

Former component parties
 Socialist Popular Alliance Party
 Socialist Party of Egypt
 Egyptian Current Party
 Egyptian Alliance Party
 Equality and Development Party
 Coalition of the Youth of the Revolution
 Freedom Egypt Party

References

2011 establishments in Egypt
2012 disestablishments in Egypt
Defunct political party alliances in Egypt
Egyptian democracy movements
Liberal parties in Egypt
Organizations disestablished in 2012
Organizations established in 2011
Organisations of the Egyptian Crisis (2011–2014)
Political opposition organizations
Socialism in Egypt